Alfred Lazarus Fingleston (16 December 1920 – 13 May 2012), better known as Les Leston, or in full Leslie Leston, was a British racing driver, born in Bulwell, Nottinghamshire.

Early life

In his early life Leston was a successful drummer for the jazz band The Clay Pigeons. He also served in WW2 as a mid-upper gunner in an Avro Lancaster.

In 1939 before the outbreak of war he was the shopkeeper for fancy and toilet goods as part of the family business, and soon after the war finished he and his father "Monty" (otherwise Henry or Harry ) set up a successful aeronautical accessories business, Aero Spares, a company involved in a variety of technical appliances made for war planes.

He was the younger brother of the entomologist Dennis Leston.

Racing career

He started racing in a Jaguar SS100 before acquiring a 500cc Cooper and his own Leston Special. He won the Luxembourg Grand Prix in 1952 (a race containing Stirling Moss and Peter Collins), and became a Cooper works driver in 1954 winning the British Formula Three championship in the same year. He participated in three Formula One World Championship Grands Prix, debuting on 2 September 1956, but scored no championship points. He was entered to 1962 Le Mans by Colin Chapman to co-drive with Tony Shelly in a Lotus 23, but the race organizer, ACO, denied the entry in the famous Lotus Le Mans debacle. His best success at Le Mans came as an Aston Martin works driver with Roy Salvadori where he finished 6th overall in 1957.

From 1958 to 1960 he had a successful stint in a Riley 1.5 becoming British Saloon Car champion in Class B as well as campaigning the car in the Monte Carlo Rally and using it as a daily run about for business and pleasure.

He was most famous for driving the famous DADIO - a Lotus Elite. His duels with Graham Warner in LOV1 have gone down in British racing history. He would become British GT Champion in this car and have many victories.

Life outside racing 

After escaping from a serious crash at Caen in 1958 when his F2 Lotus seized and the engine caught fire, he concentrated on his ever-expanding motorcar accessories business – the field that he was best known for. Les Leston Accessories merchandised aftermarket parts for cars, such as steering wheels and gear levers. The steering wheels were made in Walsall and like with most things in the aftermarket motoring accessories field Les Leston was the first to offer such items - hence he gained the tag as the godfather of the motoring aftermarket.

It was after receiving burns in the crash in Caen (where he leapt from the car at 90 mph) that he pioneered the marketing of flameproof overalls. At the time many racing drivers wore short sleeved shirts - Leston's fame and connection to all the great Formula One drivers meant that very soon a lot of them were wearing Les Leston overalls. Graham Hill appeared regularly in Leston's adverts in such overalls, also sporting the Leston made Graham Hill rally master jacket.

In the late 1960s Leston became a Formula One pit reporter for the BBC, until he was replaced by Barrie Gill.

In the 1990s Leston lived in Hong Kong, where he was married twice and expanded his merchandising business sourcing-in from China the giveaways, etc., that were rewards for incentives such as submitting cereal-box tops. His lifestyle involved owning a large cruiser that he would take out to sea at weekends and a jazz radio show. He frequented the bar of the Foreign Correspondents' Club, and for leisure he rode a BMW 1,200 cc motor bike.

Racing record

Complete Formula One World Championship results
(key)

Complete British Saloon Car Championship results
(key) (Races in bold indicate pole position; races in italics indicate fastest lap.)

† Events with 2 races staged for the different classes.

 Car over 1000cc - Not eligible for points.

References

 Les Leston profile at The 500 Owners Association

English racing drivers
English Formula One drivers
1920 births
2012 deaths
People from Bulwell
Sportspeople from Nottinghamshire
24 Hours of Le Mans drivers
British Formula Three Championship drivers
British Touring Car Championship drivers
Connaught Formula One drivers
Cooper Formula One drivers
BRM Formula One drivers
World Sportscar Championship drivers
Royal Air Force personnel of World War II
Royal Air Force airmen